Strober is a surname. Notable people with the surname include:

Myra Strober (born  1940), American economist
Rashida Strober, American playwright and activist
Samuel Strober (born  1940), American physician